Synodontis arnoulti is a species of upside-down catfish native to the Volta River basin of Burkina Faso and Ghana.  This species grows to a length of  TL.

References

External links 

arnoulti
Catfish of Africa
Freshwater fish of West Africa
Fish described in 1966